Ganesh Acharya is an Indian choreographer, film director, and actor who prominently works in Bollywood.

He won the National Film Award for Best Choreography for his work on the songs "Hawan Kund" from Bhaag Milkha Bhaag (2013) and "Gori tu lath mar" from Toilet: Ek Prem Katha (2017). At the 61st Filmfare Awards, he was nominated for Best Choreographer for his song "Malhaari" from Bajirao Mastani (2015).

Early life 
Ganesh was born into a Tamil family in Madras, India. Ganesh's father, a dancer and choreographer, died when he was 11 years old, plunging his family into financial ruin and forcing Ganesh to discontinue his studies. He later moved to Cuttack, Orissa. Then, with the help of his sister, he began to learn to dance.

Career
Ganesh started his career by working as an assistant, to founding his own dance company at the age of 12. He then became a choreographer and worked in his first film, Anaam, in 1992.

He was nominated for best choreography for "Badi Mushkil," a song from Lajja (2001), in the Screen Weekly Awards in 2002. In 2005, he was nominated for a Zee Cine Award for Best Choreographer for the song "Aisa Jadoo Dala Re" from Khakhee (2004). He won the Filmfare award for best choreography in 2007 for the song "Beedi" from Omkara (2006).

Ganesh choreographed five notable films in 2006, namely Rang De Basanti, Phir Hera Pheri, Golmaal, Omkara and Lage Raho Munna Bhai.

Ganesh decided to pursue a career in film direction. Manoj Bajpai and Juhi Chawla star in his debut film Swami (2007), which he also produced and wrote.

Ganesh Acharya directed the comedy film Money Hai To Honey Hai in 2008. He appeared as a villain in the Tamil film Rowthiram in 2011.

Ganesh Acharya choreographed "Chikni Chameli" a song from the 2012 film Agneepath, which starred Katrina Kaif.

His favourite dancer is Govinda, and his favourite actress is Madhuri Dixit.

He made a cameo appearance as Mr. Zar in the hit Chinese film Operation Mekong (2016).

Filmography

Choreographer 
 Brahmāstra (2022) (song "Dance ka Bhoot")
 Ayalaan (2022)
 Pushpa: The Rise (2021)
 Coolie No.1 (2020) 
 Pailwaan (2019)
 Simmba (2018)
 Zero (2018)
 K.G.F: Chapter 1 (2018, Hindi Dubbed version)
 Batti Gul Meter Chalu (2018)
 Sanju (2018)
 Baaghi 2 (2018, song "Ek Do Teen")
 Padmaavat (2018) 
 Bhikari (2017)
 Judwaa 2 (2017)
 Bhoomi (2017)
 Sarkar 3 (2017)
 Munna Michael (2017)
 DJ: Duvvada Jagannadham (2017)
 Toilet: Ek Prem Katha (2017)
 Badrinath Ki Dulhania (2017)
 Jolly LLB 2 (2017)
 Baar Baar Dekho (2016)
 Dongari Ka Raja (2016, song "Choli Block Buster")
 Housefull 3 (2016)
 Baaghi (2016)
 Downtown (2016)
 Sanam Re (2015)
 Bajirao Mastani (2015)
 Singh Is Bliing  (2015)
 Calendar Girls (2015)
 Brothers (2015, song Mera Naam Mary Hai)
 Welcome Back (2015)
 Suresh (2015)
 Mumbai Can Dance Saala (2015)
 Humshakals (2014)
 PK (2014)
 Heropanti (2014)
 Main Tera Hero (2014)
 Goliyon Ki Raasleela Ram-Leela (2013)
 Mr. Money (2013) 
 Yeh Jawaani Hai Deewani (2013) 
 Commando: A One Man Army (2013) 
 ABCD: Any Body Can Dance (2013)
 Chashme Baddoor (2013)
 Zila Ghaziabad (2013)
 Special 26 (2013) 
 Main Krishna Hoon (2013)
 Casanovva (2012)
 Dabangg 2 (2012) 
 Khiladi 786 (2012) 
 Son of Sardaar (2012) 
 Chakravyuh (2012) 
 OMG – Oh My God! (2012) 
 Heroine (2012) 
 Jeena Hai Toh Thok Daal (2012) 
 Department (2012) 
 Agneepath (2012) 
 Bodyguard (2011) 
 Singham (2011) 
 Double Dhamaal (2011) 
 Bin Bulaye Baraati (2011) 
 Isi Life Mein (2010) 
 Khuda Kasam (2010) 
 Action Replayy (2010) 
 Khatta Meetha (2010) 
 Raavan (2010)
 My Friend Ganesha 3 (2010) 
 De Dana Dan (2009) 
 Jail (2009) 
 Baabarr (2009) 
 Shadow (2009) 
 Teree Sang (2009) 
 Ek Se Bure Do (2009) 
 Kisse Pyaar Karoon (2009) 
 Victory (2009) 
 Hari Puttar: A Comedy of Terrors (2008) 
 God Tussi Great Ho (2008) 
 Mehbooba (2008) 
 Haal-e-Dil (2008) 
 Krazzy 4 (2008) 
 U Me Aur Hum (2008) 
 One Two Three (2008) 
 Race (2008) 
 Rama Rama Kya Hai Dramaa? (2008) 
 Sunday (2008)
 Halla Bol (2008) 
 Dhamaal (2007) 
 Chak De! India (2007) 
 Aap Kaa Surroor (2007) 
 Swami (2007)
 Ek Chalis Ki Last Local (2007) 
 Nehlle Pe Dehlla (2007) 
 Risk (2007) 
 Bhagam Bhag (2006) 
 Jaane Hoga Kya (2006) 
 Lage Raho Munna Bhai (2006) 
 Omkara (2006) 
 Golmaal (2006) 
 Phir Hera Pheri (2006) 
 36 China Town (2006) 
 Humko Deewana Kar Gaye (2006) 
 Saawan... The Love Season (2006) 
 Humko Tumse Pyaar Hai (2006) 
 Chingaari (2006) 
 Rang De Basanti (2006) 
 Dosti: Friends Forever (2005) 
 Deewane Huye Paagal (2005) 
 Garam Masala (2005) 
 Shaadi No. 1 (2005) 
 Maine Pyaar Kyun Kiya? (2005) 
 Shabnam Mausi (2005) 
 Main Aisa Hi Hoon (2005)
 Blackmail (2005) 
 Insan (2005) 
 Vayasu Pasanga (2004)
 Ab Tumhare Hawale Watan Saathiyo (2004) 
 Aabra Ka Daabra (2004) 
 Aitraaz (2004) 
 Madhoshi (2004) 
 Dil Ne Jise Apna Kahaa (2004) 
 Taarzan: The Wonder Car (2004) 
 Mujhse Shaadi Karogi (2004) 
 Garv (2004) 
 Aan: Men at Work (2004) 
 Run (2004) 
 Masti (2004) 
 Kismat (2004) 
 Woh Tera Naam Tha (2004) 
 Aetbaar (2004) 
 Khakee (2004) 
 Plan (2004) 
 Munna Bhai M.B.B.S. (2003) 
 Sssshhh... (2003) 
 Zameen (2003) 
 Chupke Se (2003) 
 Tere Naam (2003) 
 The Hero (2003) 
 Ek Aur Ek Gyarah (2003) 
 Dhund: The Fog (2003) 
 Love at Times Square (2003) 
 Kucch To Hai (2003) 
 Chalo Ishq Ladaaye (2002) 
 Rishtey (2002) 
 Waah! Tera Kya Kehna (2002) 
 Annarth (2002) 
 Road (2002)
 Shakti: The Power (2002) 
 Chor Machaaye Shor (2002) 
 Soch (2002) 
 Jaani Dushman (2002) 
 Yeh Hai Jalwa (2002) 
 Akhiyon Se Goli Maare (2002) 
 Badhaai Ho Badhaai (2002) 
 The Legend of Bhagat Singh (2002) 
 Hum Kisise Kum Nahin (2002) 
 Pyaar Diwana Hota Hai (2002) 
 Pyar Ki Dhun (2002) 
 Aap Mujhe Achche Lagne Lage (2002) 
 Kranti (2002) 
 Raaz (2002) 
 Deewaanapan (2001) 
 Indian (2001) 
 Rehnaa Hai Terre Dil Mein (2001) 
 Ajnabee (2001) 
 Kyo Kii... Main Jhuth Nahin Bolta (2001) 
 Ittefaq (2001) 
 Lajja (2001) 
 Yeh Raaste Hain Pyaar Ke (2001) 
 Bas Itna Sa Khwaab Hai (2001) 
 Jodi No.1 (2001) 
 Farz (2001) 
 Khiladi 420 (2000) 
 Jis Desh Mein Ganga Rehta Hain (2000) 
 Aaghaaz (2000) 
 Shikari (2000) 
 Hamara Dil Aapke Paas Hai (2000) 
 Hadh Kar Di Aapne (2000) 
 Refugee (2000) 
 Kunwara (2000) 
 Jung (2000) 
 Tera Jadoo Chal Gayaa (2000) 
 Beti No.1 (2000) 
 Joru Ka Ghulam (2000) 
 Chal Mere Bhai (2000) 
 Baaghi (2000) 
 Dulhan Hum Le Jayenge (2000)
 En Sakhiye (2000) 
 Thakshak (1999) 
 Vaastav: The Reality (1999) 
 Hello Brother (1999) 
 Baadshah (1999)
 Arjun Pandit (1999)
 Mann (1999)
 Hote Hote Pyaar Ho Gaya (1999)
 Haseena Maan Jaayegi (1999)
 Sirf Tum (1999)
 Anari No.1 (1999)
 Jaanam Samjha Karo (1999)
 Silsila Hai Pyar Ka (1999) 
 International Khiladi (1999) 
 Kaala Samrajya (1999) 
 Lal Baadshah(1999) 
 Wajood (1998) 
 Soldier (1998) 
 Bade Miyan Chote Miyan (1998) 
 Bandhan (1998) 
 Tirchhi Topiwale (1998) 
 Achanak (1998) 
 Gharwali Baharwali (1998) 
 Badmaash (1998)
 Judwaa (1997)
 Ghulam-E-Mustafa (1997) 
 Bhai (1997) 
 Mr. and Mrs. Khiladi (1997) 
 Ziddi (1997) 
 Auzaar (1997) 
 Chhote Sarkar (1996) 
 Saajan Chale Sasural (1996) 
 Coolie No. 1 (1995) 
 Taaqat (1995) 
 Maidan-E-Jung (1995) 
 Anaam (1992)

Actor

 Night Dancers: The Reboot (TBA)
 Dehati Disco (2022)
 Zero (2018)
 Mausam Ikrar Ke Do Pal Pyar Ke (2018)
 Operation Mekong  (Chinese Movie, 2016)
 Welcome Back (2015)
 Hey Bro (2015)
 ABCD: Any Body Can Dance (2013)
 Rowthiram (2012)
 Trishna (2011)
 Raavan (2010)
 Vighnaharta Shree Siddhivinayak (2009)
 Money Hai Toh Honey Hai (2008)
 Jalwa - Fun in Love (2005)
 Vayasu Pasanga (2004)
 Koi Hai (2003)
 Road (2002)
 Company (2002)
 En Sakhiye (2000)
 Hands Up! (2000)
 Ghatak (1996)
 Jaisi Karni Waisi Bharnii (1989)
 Roti Ki Keemat (1990)

Director 
 Swami (2007)
 Money Hai Toh Honey Hai (2008)
 Angel (2011)
 Bhikari (2017)

Personal life 

In November 2000, Ganesh married film producer Vidhi Acharya. They have a daughter named Soundarya Acharya.

References 

Filmfare Awards winners
Indian choreographers
Living people
1971 births
Best Choreography National Film Award winners